Yser, originally named Sénégalais, was a frigate in the Free French Naval Forces during World War II and the French Navy post-war. The ship was originally built as USS Corbesier (DE-106), an American  named for Antoine Joseph Corbesier, for more than 40 years he was the beloved swordmaster of the U.S. Naval Academy Midshipmen.

History
During World War II, Corbesier was transferred to the Free French Naval Forces under lend lease on 2 January 1944, and renamed Sénégalais.  Ownership of the vessel was transferred to France on 21 April 1952 under the Mutual Defense Assistance Program. She was renamed Yser about that same time.

World War II
In the night on 2/3 May 1944,  was spotted recharging her batteries on the surface off Djidjelli on the Algerian coast. The area was swamped with six escorts from the convoy GUS-38 and three aircraft squadrons. At 01.18 hours on 3 May, the U-boat managed to damage  with a Gnat in the stern. The other vessels hunted the U-boat until the early morning of 4 May when Fenksi had to surface his boat and save his crew, but at 04.04 hours he still fought back and also damaged the FFL Sénégalais (T 22) with a Gnat before scuttling the U-boat.

First Indochina War
 Sénégalais was sent to the far east in October 1945 and later participated in the First Indochina War.

See also
List of escorteurs of the French Navy

References

External links
 
 http://www.desausa.org/de_alpha_listing.htm

Cannon-class destroyer escorts of the United States Navy
Ships built in Wilmington, Delaware
1943 ships
Cannon-class destroyer escorts of the Free French Naval Forces
World War II frigates of France
Cold War frigates of France
Cannon-class destroyer escorts of the French Navy
Ships built by Dravo Corporation